The Redditch Arrows were an American Football team based initially in Redditch and later in Birmingham, United Kingdom. They were formed in 1986 and disbanded in 2009.

History
The Arrows were established in early 1986. During the late 1980s, they played in three different leagues; the UKAFL, the Budweiser League and then BNGL, during which they made the playoffs twice. In 1989, after a playoff run, they reached the BNGL Premier Division Bowl Game, where they lost to the Kingston Thames Pirates, who were in their debut season, 66-8. During this time, they played their home games at the Abbey Stadium in Redditch.

After a down period, punctuated by being unable to compete in 1992 due to a player shortage, they reached the BAFL Division 3 final, where they lost to the Winchester Rifles. After again making the playoffs in 2000, they were promoted to Division One.

Finished with a creditable 3-5-0 record in 2001. Had a poor 2002 season finishing with a 0-9-1 record which resulted in them returning to Division Two in 2003, where they finished with a 4-6-0 record. Had a stunning regular season in 2004 finishing 9-0-1, but fell at the first hurdle in the playoffs in a thriller to Sussex Thunder 23-22. In the 2000s, the Arrows played their home games at Kings Norton RFC.

Notable former players
All players listed below appeared for the Redditch Arrows during their career.

 QB Dave Stanton 
 RB Anthony Perkins  
 RB Charles Humphrey 
 RB Dave Mills 
 WR Mark Cohen 
 OL/DE Matt Sheldon 
 DB Mark Williams 
 OL Gary Matthews 
 OL David Robinson 
 FL Darren Biddle  .        
FS Karl Watkins🇬🇧
WR Pete Morgan 🇬🇧
LB Rich “Elmo” Wilby 🇬🇧

Notable Former Coaches
 Ian Hill 
 Mark Williams

Season by Season record

Notes

External links
Redditch Arrows website (No Longer Updated)

BAFA National League teams
Sport in Birmingham, West Midlands
1986 establishments in England
American football teams established in 1986
American football teams in England